David Lawrence Ramsey III (born September 3, 1960) is an American personal finance personality, radio show host, author, and businessman. An evangelical Christian, he hosts the nationally syndicated radio program The Ramsey Show. Ramsey has written several books, including The New York Times bestseller The Total Money Makeover, and hosted a television show on Fox Business from 2007 to 2010.

Early life
Ramsey was born in Antioch, Tennessee, to real estate developers. He attended Antioch High School where he played ice hockey. At age 18, Ramsey took the real estate exam and began selling property, working through college at The University of Tennessee, Knoxville, where he earned a Bachelor of Science degree in Finance and Real Estate.

By 1986, Ramsey had amassed a significant portfolio worth over $4million. However, when the Competitive Equality Banking Act of 1987 took effect, several banks changed ownership and recalled his $1.2million in loans and lines of credit because he was over-leveraged. Ramsey was unable to pay and filed for bankruptcy in 1988.

Career
Ramsey experienced several years of financial recovery and began offering financial advice to couples at his local church. In 1988 he founded the Lampo Group, a financial counseling service, and in 1992 he wrote and self-published his first book, Financial Peace.

Ramsey began as one of three alternating hosts of The Money Game on radio station WWTN/Nashville in 1992. The show eventually became The Dave Ramsey Show, Ramsey's daily three-hour call-in financial advice talk show.

Financial Peace University, Ramsey's nine-lesson, video-based personal finance course, debuted in 1994. The Gannett newspaper group ran his financial column, though it was dropped when they realized that Ramsey had changed the names on the letters to which he was responding. He offered to pay them their money back. The Dave Ramsey Show aired on the Fox Business Network from 2007 to 2010.

In 2014, The Lampo Group, Inc. was rebranded as Ramsey Solutions. The company's headquarters are located in Franklin, Tennessee, and a new 47-acre campus opened there in 2019.

Ramsey has written five books for adults, three of which were New York Times bestsellers, and six children's books. He was inducted into the National Radio Hall of Fame in 2015.

Teachings
Ramsey advises listeners to first reduce debt using the debt snowball method, where debtors pay off their lowest balances first.

Ramsey adamantly opposes the use of credit cards. At live shows, he sometimes takes out his wallet to show audiences the "only four pieces of plastic" he carries: A business debit card, a personal debit card, a driver's license, and a concealed-carry permit. Ramsey encourages the use of cash and advises families to utilize an envelope system, putting a cash allocation for each month's food, entertainment, etc., in separate envelopes and then spending only what is in the envelope.

Ramsey encourages people not to take on student loan debt and calls the idea that student loans are required for college "a myth".

Criticism
Critics of Ramsey's core teachings point out that they are often a "one-size-fits-all" approach that both disregards income disparities and ignores financial emergencies. The debt snowball method is frequently debated, and studies have returned results that both support and oppose its efficacy. Ramsey's investing advice has also drawn criticism over its reliance on stock investment, as opposed to bonds, using mutual funds with load fees, and its frequent claim of 12% annual returns on investments.

Controversies
In 2014, The Daily Beast reported that Ramsey had lashed out against former employees he claimed were discussing working conditions at the company on Facebook and Twitter. At company staff meetings, Ramsey allegedly recounted conversations from a private Facebook group of former employees that he had infiltrated, eventually offering cash rewards for the identities of some members who took to anonymous Twitter accounts once they realized Ramsey had joined the private group. The incident prompted increased backlash, a meeting Ramsey set up to confront alleged critics, and the eventual deletion of several of the critical Twitter accounts.

Company policies regarding marriage, sex and homosexuality
According to a September 2021 lawsuit, when Julie Anne Stamps, a Ramsey Solutions employee on the customer care team, approached her supervisor regarding coming out as a lesbian in May 2020, the supervisor explained that company policy would not allow Stamps to continue to be employed at Ramsey Solutions. Stamps alleges that her departure from the company was further expedited once the United States Supreme Court June 15, 2020, ruling in Bostock v. Clayton County was decided. Ramsey Solutions denies the accusations.

In July 2020, Caitlin O'Connor, a former Ramsey Solutions employee, filed a federal lawsuit against the company alleging that she was fired for being pregnant and, since she wasn't married to the baby's father, for violating Ramsey Solutions' employee conduct policies. On May 27, 2021, O'Connor gave her first interview about the termination and her experience working for Ramsey.

On March 10, 2021, featured personality Chris Hogan left the company citing "things going on in my personal life ... that are not in line with Ramsey Solutions." Hogan's resignation followed a request for his personnel file at Ramsey Solutions during the Caitlin O'Connor case. Prior to the release of his book Everyday Millionaires, Hogan admitted to several affairs, including one with a co-worker at Ramsey Solutions during his marriage to wife Melissa Hogan. References to his book and videos are still available on the Ramsey website and YouTube channels; however, direct links on the Ramsey Solutions website are replaced with a redirect page for other company resources.

In May 2021, Religion News Service (RNS) obtained recordings of Ramsey mocking employees over the policy and explaining Hogan's 2019 absence as a "rest break" following the affair accusations. Melissa Hogan, Chris Hogan's ex-wife, issued a statement to RNS claiming that the company downplayed Chris's behavior, covered for him and characterized her behavior as "anger, hyperbole, and drama".

COVID-19 response
In December 2020, a complaint was filed with the Franklin health department alleging that caterers hired for the Ramsey Solutions Christmas party at its company headquarters were instructed not to wear masks or gloves while serving, which the company later confirmed to the local NBC affiliate. Ramsey Solutions responded that there was no truth to the complaint. The company had drawn attention earlier in the pandemic for remaining open after employees tested positive for the virus, for ignoring recommendations to avoid large gatherings, and for hosting a July business conference after the Marriott hotel cancelled citing safety concerns. 

On his radio show and in staff meetings, Ramsey railed against face coverings and other COVID-19 precautions, calling them "a sign of fear". On his March 2, 2020, show, he mocked concerned ticket holders for his upcoming live events, calling anyone who wanted a refund a "wuss" and insisting that he would be attending the upcoming "Live Like No One Else" cruise "by my freaking self" if necessary.

In February 2021, Ramsey appeared on Fox News, where he said, "I don't believe in stimulus checks, because if $600 or $1,400 changes your life you were pretty much screwed already. You got other issues going on."

In a December 2021 federal lawsuit, a former employee alleged that Ramsey violated his religious rights by firing him when he took scientifically prescribed precautions against COVID-19. The lawsuit said Ramsey ran a "cultlike" environment where employees who worried about the pandemic were accused of "weakness of spirit" and told to pray if they wanted to ward off the virus. Ramsey Solutions has denied all accusations and has claimed the suit was “completely false.”

Personal life
Ramsey married his wife Sharon in 1982, and the Ramseys have three children: Denise (Ramsey) Whittemore, Rachel (Ramsey) Cruze, and Daniel Ramsey. All three work for Ramsey Solutions. With Ramsey, Cruze co-wrote and published the New York Times No. 1 bestseller Smart Money, Smart Kids in 2014.

Ramsey had an estimated net worth of $55 million as of 2018. He sold his custom-built home in the Nashville, Tennessee, area for $10.2million in 2021 after living there for over a decade. A spokesperson said he was having another home built in the area. 

Ramsey is an evangelical Christian who describes himself as conservative, both fiscally and culturally. He has blamed politics for what he considers Americans' economic dependence, and has said presidents should do "as little as possible" about the economy.

References

External links
2003 profile by This American Life
"Ask Dave Ramsey" on the Christian Broadcasting Network

1960 births
Living people
20th-century American businesspeople
20th-century American non-fiction writers
21st-century American businesspeople
21st-century American non-fiction writers
American business writers
American education businesspeople
American financial commentators
American finance and investment writers
American financial literacy activists
American motivational speakers
American motivational writers
American self-help writers
American talk radio hosts
People from Antioch, Tennessee
People from Nashville, Tennessee
Personal finance education
Radio personalities from Tennessee
University of Tennessee alumni
Writers from Tennessee
Christians from Tennessee
American male non-fiction writers
20th-century American male writers
21st-century American male writers
American conservative talk radio hosts